Calvin Stanley Branch (born May 8, 1974) is a former professional American football cornerback in the  National Football League (NFL). He played for five seasons for the Oakland Raiders. He works as a scout for the Raiders.

References

1974 births
Living people
Players of American football from Lexington, Kentucky
American football cornerbacks
Colorado State Rams football players
Iowa State Cyclones football players
Oakland Raiders players